The year 1966 in archaeology involved some significant events.

Excavations
 Excavation of the Maya site of Chinkultic by Stephan F. de Borhegyi of the Public Museum of Milwaukee, Wisconsin.
 New excavations at Viroconium (Wroxeter) in England begin.
 Excavations at Mezhirich, Ukraine, by I. G. Pidoplichko begin (continue to 1974).
 First organized excavations at Minshat Abu Omar.
 Excavations at Tel Arad by Yohanan Aharoni (continues until 1967).

Finds
 March 22 - The Fishpool Hoard from Nottinghamshire, England
 The third trove of Qabala treasures
 Ongoing excavations at Peking Man Site in Zhoukoudian, China unearth a premolar and two pieces of skull fragment
 The Magerius Mosaic from Smirat, Tunisia

Publications
 Max Mallowan - Nimrud and its Remains.
 Oxford City and County Museum - City of Oxford Redevelopment: Archaeological Implications.

Events
 June 18 - The archaeology-related television series Chronicle begins airing on BBC Two in the United Kingdom.
 The existence of at least 123 rock-cut monolithic churches in the Tigray Region is revealed by Ethiopian Catholic priest Dr Abba Tewelde Medhin Josief at a conference.
 Start of probably the first course in the United States to carry the title "Historical Archaeology", taught at the University of Pennsylvania by John L. Cotter of the National Park Service.

Births
 August 30 - Joann Fletcher, English Egyptologist

Deaths
 June 5 - Natacha Rambova, American costume designer and Egyptologist (born 1897)

References

Archaeology
Archaeology, 1966 In
Archaeology by year
Archaeology, 1966 In